The Dutch Eerste Divisie in the 1967–68 season was contested by 19 teams, one team less than in the previous season. This was due to a merger between FC Zaanstreek and Alkmaar '54 to form AZ'67. Holland Sport won the championship.

New entrants
Promoted from the 1966–67 Tweede Divisie:
 HFC Haarlem
 HVC
 VVV-Venlo
Relegated from the 1966–67 Eredivisie:
 Elinkwijk
 Willem II

League standings

Relegation play-off
Racing Club Heemstede and VVV-Venlo entered a relegation play-off. After a draw in the first match, a second match was played. Both matches were played on neutral terrain (HVC and Vitesse).

Replay

VVV-Venlo were relegated to the Tweede Divisie.

See also
 1967–68 Eredivisie
 1967–68 Tweede Divisie

References
Netherlands - List of final tables (RSSSF)

Eerste Divisie seasons
2
Neth